At the 1996 Summer Olympics in Atlanta 4 tennis events (2 for men and 2 for women) were contested. For the first time since the 1924 Olympics, a Third place playoff was held to decide who would be awarded the bronze medal in each event.

Medal summary

Medal table

Events

References
 ITF Olympic Site

1996
 
1996 Summer Olympics events
Olympics
1996 Olympics